Glenn Emile Duncan (May 12, 1918 – July 4, 1998) was a career officer in the United States Air Force and one of the leading aces of Eighth Air Force in World War II in Europe and the top ace of the 353rd Fighter Group. Duncan was credited with 19.5 victories, one probable victory, and seven damaged German aircraft. He also destroyed at least nine enemy aircraft on the ground, while flying P-47 Thunderbolts with the 353rd Fighter Group. He flew combat missions in the P-47 Thunderbolts and P-51 Mustangs in Europe.

Early life
Duncan was born on May 19, 1918, in Bering, Texas.

Military career
He enlisted in the Aviation Cadet Program of the U.S. Army Air Corps on February 9, 1940, and was commissioned a 2nd Lieutenant  and awarded his pilot wings at Kelly Field, Texas, on October 5, 1940.

World War II
Duncan served as an instructor pilot for a year and then served in Panama from December 1941 to January 1943, before completing P-47 Thunderbolt training and being assigned first to the 361st Fighter Group, and then to the 353rd Fighter Group in England in March 1943.

In mid-1943, the 353rd FG was initially stationed at RAF Goxhill in Lincolnshire, England, before moving to RAF Metfield in Suffolk, England in August 1943. After switching its base to Metfield, the 353rd FG flew its first combat mission. On September 23, 1943, Duncan scored his first victory, a Fw 190 over Nantes. He began flying frequent escort missions and destroyed a Fw 190 and Bf 109 on November 11, for which he received the Distinguished Service Cross. He was made full Colonel in November 1944.

Duncan became a flying ace, when he destroyed a Fw 190 over Rastede on December 20, his fifth aerial victory. During a bomber escort near Ans, Belgium on 20 January 1944, his flight encountered four twin-engined Me 110s. In the dogfight, he destroyed two Me 110s. In April 1944, the 353rd FG moved to their new base in RAF Raydon.

By June 7, 1944, he had accumulated 15½ kills. On the 12th June, he shot down three Bf-109s. He claimed his 19th and last aerial victory on July 5, when he shot down a Bf 109 over Pont-Audemer.

On July 7, 1944, while leading an aerial attack on an aerodrome at Wesendorf, his P-47 was hit by anti-aircraft fire. His crippled P-47 continued to fly on until he belly landed near Nienburg. As he left his aircraft, he tossed a grenade into it to ensure that it won't fall into the German hands, resulting in the destruction of the aircraft.

He then evaded capture on foot and walked towards Netherlands. He joined the Dutch resistance, before being liberated by the Allied forces 10 months later, in April 1945.

Duncan then rejoined the 353rd Fighter Group as its commanding officer, which was now equipped with the P-51 Mustang. He served until October 1945, when he returned to the U.S. He then returned to Germany and served on occupation duty from January to August 1946.

During World War II, Duncan was credited in the destruction of 19.5 enemy aircraft in the air, 7 damaged and 1 probable. He was also credited in destroying 9 enemy aircraft on the ground, while strafing enemy airfields.

During his time with the 353rd FG, he flew aircraft bearing the name "Dove of Peace", with code LH-X. There were P-47s and P-51 with this title in the 353rd Fighter Group at that time.

Post war
He then served as an instructor with the Air National Guard until June 1949, when he became a White House Liaison Officer. Duncan served at the White House and with Headquarters U.S. Air Force in the Pentagon until May 1953, when he was transferred to Japan to serve as Deputy Commander of the 39th Air Division at Misawa Air Base, from August 1953 to July 1956.

His next assignment was as Commander of the 1st Fighter Wing at Selfridge Air Force Base, Michigan, from September 1956 to August 1959, before attending the Industrial College of the Armed Forces from August 1959 to July 1960. Duncan next served on the staff of Headquarters Air Defense Command at Ent Air Force Base, Colorado, from July 1960 to September 1965, followed by service as Deputy Commander of the 314th Air Division at Osan Air Base, South Korea, from September 1965 to June 1966.

He served as Base Commander of Stewart Air Force Base, New York, from August 1966 to August 1969, and then as Special Assistant to the Vice Commander of 1st Air Force at Stewart AFB, from August 1969 until his retirement from the Air Force on February 1, 1970.

Later life
Duncan died on July 14, 1998, and was buried at Arlington National Cemetery.

Awards and decorations
Glenn Duncan's  ribbons, including retroactive awards:-

  Command pilot badge

Distinguished Service Cross citation
Duncan, Glenn E.
Lieutenant Colonel (then Major), U.S Army Air Forces
353rd Fighter Group, 8th Air Force
Date of Action: November 11, 1943
Headquarters, European Theater of Operations, U.S. Army, General Orders No. 2 (January 10, 1944)

Citation:

The President of the United States of America, authorized by Act of Congress, July 9, 1918, takes pleasure in presenting the Distinguished Service Cross to Lieutenant Colonel (Air Corps), [then Major] Glenn Emile Duncan, United States Army Air Forces, for extraordinary heroism in connection with military operations against an armed enemy while serving as Pilot of a P-47 Fighter Airplane in the 353d Fighter Group, EIGHTH Air Force, in aerial combat against enemy forces over enemy-occupied Europe while leading a group of fighter aircraft on 11 November 1943. As a result of leading a squadron of his group against a large number of enemy aircraft, Lieutenant Colonel Duncan became separated from his group. He observed enemy aircraft attacking bombers and, though at an unfavorable altitude and in the face of overwhelming odds, Lieutenant Colonel Duncan vigorously attacked the enemy aircraft, destroying one and dispersing the remainder. While proceeding to his home base, he observed four enemy aircraft attacking a straggling Fortress. Although his gas supply was dangerously low, he engaged the enemy and dispersed them, thereby saving the Fortress and its crew. The action of Lieutenant Colonel Duncan reflect the highest credit upon himself and the armed forces of the United States.

References 

1918 births
1998 deaths
American World War II flying aces
Aviators from Texas
Burials at Arlington National Cemetery
Recipients of the Distinguished Service Cross (United States)
Recipients of the Distinguished Flying Cross (United States)
Recipients of the Silver Star
Recipients of the Air Medal
Recipients of the Distinguished Flying Cross (United Kingdom)
Recipients of the Croix de guerre (Belgium)
Recipients of the Croix de Guerre 1939–1945 (France)
United States Air Force colonels
United States Army Air Forces pilots of World War II
Military personnel from Texas